Catherine Trianon (née Boule, called La Trianon 1627 – 6 May 1681), was a French fortune teller, widely known for her involvement in the famous Poison Affair. She along with other colleagues were responsible for the attempted assassination of the king Louis XIV of France in 1679.

Background 
Catherine Trianon, was a widow and a professional fortune teller. She was considered to be one of the most important associates of La Voisin, but also a personal friend and confidante. La Trianon managed her business with her partner, La Doddée, who was also her lover in a homosexual relationship. Trianon was described by her colleagues as very well educated. She had a reception room that contained a human skeleton, which was said to be a pious reminder of mortality.

Poison Affair 
In 1679, Madame de Montespan commissioned La Voisin to murder King Louis XIV of France.  It was at the home of Trianon that La Voisin conspired with the help of her lovers, Bertrand and Romani. As a friend, Trianon tried to convince La Voisin to abandon the plan, even making up a horoscope to warn her that it would be a mistake, but did not succeed.  The group decided that the King should be poisoned by a petition. On 5 March, La Voisin's first attempt at poisoning the King failed; she planned to meet with Trianon on 12 March to plan the next attempt but was arrested before anything conspired. Shortly after Voisons arrest in May, Trianon was arrested.

Upon her arrest, authorities found 25 "manuscript volumes on the occult sciences" in her house.

In August 1680, after the execution of La Voisin in February, the connection between La Voisin, Montespan, and the plan to assassinate the King was revealed by her daughter, Marguerite Monvoisin, who on 9 October also confirmed the statements made by Adam Lesage in August of child sacrifice at the black masses. After her statements about Montespan and child sacrifice were confirmed by Francoise Filastre on 1 October and Etienne Guibourg on 10 October, Trianon, who had been personally involved in the attempt, also confirmed the statement. Catherine Trianon committed suicide in Château de Vincennes.

In fiction 
Catherine Trianon is given a fairly large portrayal in a novel by Judith Merkle Riley: The Oracle Glass (1994)

References 

 Princes and Poisoners Or Studies of the Court of Louis XIV by Frantz Funck-Brentano
 The Affair of the Poisons: Murder, Infanticide, and Satanism at the Court of Louis XIV by Anne Somerset (St. Martin's Press, 2003) 
 1679-1682, l'affaire des poisons by Arlette Lebigre

1627 births
1681 deaths
1679 crimes
17th-century French women
French occultists
Poisoners
Prisoners and detainees of France
French people who died in prison custody
17th-century occultists
17th-century LGBT people
17th-century French businesspeople
Affair of the Poisons